Armand John "A.J." Piron (August 16, 1888 – February 17, 1943) was an American jazz violinist who led a dance band during the 1920s.

Biography
After touring briefly with W.C. Handy in 1917, Piron started an orchestra which included  Lorenzo Tio, Steve Lewis, John Lindsay, and Peter Bocage. The theme song of the orchestra was "The Purple Rose of Cairo", written by Piron and Steve Lewis. In 1923, Piron took his band to New York City.

References 

1888 births
1943 deaths
Jazz musicians from New Orleans
American jazz bandleaders
American jazz composers
American male jazz composers
American jazz violinists
American male violinists
Louisiana Creole people
Victor Records artists
20th-century American violinists
20th-century American male musicians
Olympia Orchestra members
20th-century African-American musicians